Raging Wolf Bobs was a wooden roller coaster located at Geauga Lake amusement park in Ohio. Designed by Curtis D. Summers to resemble Bobs, a popular roller coaster at the defunct Riverview Park in Chicago, Raging Wolf Bobs was constructed by the Dinn Corporation and opened to the public in 1988. It operated until June 16, 2007, following an accident involving the derailing of a train that unexpectedly rolled backward on one of the track's hills. Later that season, park owners Cedar Fair announced the permanent closure of Geauga Lake, sealing the fate of Raging Wolf Bobs.

History
Geauga Lake owner Funtime, Inc. planned to add a new roller coaster – the first in ten years – to celebrate the park's centennial anniversary in 1988. Dinn Corporation was hired to install the new ride with the help of Curtis D. Summers, who modeled the design of the roller coaster after Bobs, a famous coaster from the 1920s which operated at Chicago's Riverview Park until 1967. After an investment of $2.5 million, Raging Wolf Bobs opened to the public on May 28, 1988. It was marketed with the slogan "The Legend of Terror Returns".

Following the park's permanent closure in 2007, Raging Wolf Bobs was sold in an auction to an unnamed buyer for $2,500 on June 17, 2008. In 2011, the coaster's slow dismantling began, and it was completed by early 2014.

Incident
On June 16, 2007, a train failed to climb a hill and rolled backward. The last car of a train partially derailed in the process, but there were no injuries. The incident, which caused significant damage, sidelined the attraction for the remainder of the season. Geauga Lake owner Cedar Fair announced the permanent closure of the amusement park on September 21, 2007, ending the attraction's run at Geauga Lake. Several years prior to the accident, the ride was retracked by Martin & Vleminckx.

See also
Incidents at Cedar Fair parks

References

Geauga Lake
Roller coasters operated by Cedar Fair
Former roller coasters in Ohio
Roller coasters operated by Six Flags